The Roman Catholic Diocese of Ouahigouya is a diocese located in Ouahigouya in the Ecclesiastical province of Ouagadougou in Burkina Faso.

History
 June 12, 1947: Established as Apostolic Prefecture of Ouahigouya from the Apostolic Vicariate of Ouagadougou
 June 14, 1954: Suppressed to Apostolic Vicariate of Koudougou
 June 23, 1958: Restored as Diocese of Ouahigouya from the Diocese of Koudougou

Special churches
The cathedral is Cathédrale Notre Dame de la Délivrance in Ouahigouya.

Leadership
 Bishops of Ouahigouya (Roman rite), in reverse chronological order
 Bishop Justin Kientega (February 2, 2010 -)
 Bishop Philippe Ouédraogo (July 5, 1996  – May 13, 2009),  appointed Archbishop of Ouagadougou (Cardinal in 2014)
 Bishop Marius Ouédraogo (November 8, 1984  – July 15, 1995)
 Bishop Denis Martin Tapsoba, M. Afr. (March 15, 1966  – November 8, 1984)
 Bishop Louis-Marie-Joseph Durrieu, M. Afr. (July 4, 1958  – May 31, 1965)

Other priests of this diocese who became bishops
Joachim Hermenegilde Ouédraogo, appointed Bishop of Dori in 2004
Gabriel Sayaogo, appointed Bishop of Manga in 2010

See also
Roman Catholicism in Burkina Faso

References

External links
 GCatholic.org

Ouahigouya
Christian organizations established in 1947
Roman Catholic dioceses and prelatures established in the 20th century
Ouahigouya, Roman Catholic Diocese of
1947 establishments in French Upper Volta
Roman Catholic bishops of Ouahigouya